Panan Testing & Engineering Co., Ltd. is a company with offices located in mainland China and the United States. The company is known for distributing and servicing laboratory testing instruments. Historically, the company has distributed laboratory analysis and testing equipment used by the petrochemical and pharmaceutical industry throughout The People's Republic of China.

History 
PanAn Testing & Engineering Co.,Ltd. was founded and established during 1998 by current Chairman David G. Zhou. The company began as an authorized dealer of Viscosity Testing Instruments for Cannon Instrument Company. PanAn provided sales, distribution, and engineering support within mainland China. Many of the equipment has been sold to SINOPEC, Petro-China, and CNOOC. PanAn has expanded its network towards supplying and supporting equipment manufactured by Fluitec, D-2, AD-Systems, Falex, Canty, PCS, Hydramotion, Thermaprobe, and Zematra etc.

PanAn Partnership Agreements  
Cannon Instruments Company, founded by Dr. Michael R. Cannon during 1938, makes viscosity-related products. Through a partnership agreement, PanAn is the sole and exclusive dealer of Cannon Instruments in the Mainland China region by distributing and servicing products such as the HTHS, CCS, CMRV, mini-AV, mini-QV-X, SimpleVIS, CAB, BBR, and more to customers such as Exxon-Mobil, Shell, BASF, BP, etc.

Future developments 
According to the Shanghai Lubricants Trade Association, PanAn Engineering is currently partnering with the National Institute of Technology and Standards. Panan is also assisting its sister company, Runningland, in technical and engineering support. In 2012, PanAn has entered a joint agreement with a US-based manufacturer of JF-1A-HH Handheld Conductivity Meters, D-2.

References

Companies based in Shanghai
Companies established in 1998
Privately held companies of China
Technology companies of China